S91 may refer to:
 S91 (New York City bus) serving Staten Island
 Blériot-SPAD S.91, a French biplane fighter
 County Route S91 (Bergen County, New Jersey) 
 Daihatsu Zebra (S91), a pickup truck and van
 , a submarine of the Royal Navy
 SIPA S.91, a French trainer aircraft